Flueggea elliptica is a species of plant in the family Phyllanthaceae. It is endemic to Ecuador.  Its natural habitat is subtropical or tropical moist lowland forests.

References

elliptica
Endemic flora of Ecuador
Critically endangered flora of South America
Taxonomy articles created by Polbot
Taxa named by Henri Ernest Baillon
Taxa named by Kurt Polycarp Joachim Sprengel